Kornman is a surname. Notable people with the surname include:

 Mary Kornman (1915–1973), American child actress
 Mildred Kornman (1925–2022), American child actor; sister of Mary
 Robin Kornman (1947–2007), Tibetan Buddhist scholar
 Tony Kornman (1884–1942), American cinematographer

Kornman may also refer to:
Kornman, Colorado, a place in Prowers County, Colorado, United States

See also
Charles B. Kornmann (born 1937), United States federal judge
Cornman (disambiguation)